La Maison de Mon Rêve, stylized as La maison de mon rêve ( or the house of my dream) is the debut studio album by American musical group CocoRosie. The album was recorded in an apartment in Montmartre, Paris, France during 2003 and released by Touch and Go Records on March 9, 2004 in the United States and April 12, 2004 in the United Kingdom.

The album is characterized by its lo-fi aesthetic and experimental approach to production. It has been described as pop, indie, electronic, found sounds, folk, folk rock, blues, folk-blues, and trip hop, as well as influenced by delta blues, hip hop, and 1970s folk. The album's vocal style has been compared to the vocal styles of Billie Holiday, Fiona Apple and Nelly Furtado.

CocoRosie originally planned to make only a few copies of the album, with the intent to distribute it to friends, but were allegedly persuaded by Touch and Go Records to release it under their label. The album's cover art and layout were partially designed by musician and graphic designer Jon Beasley of Hecuba, who has toured with freak folk act Devendra Banhart who featured on CocoRosie's second album Noah's Ark. The album was mastered by Roger Seibel.

Reception

La Maison de Mon Rêve received generally mixed reviews. Sam Ubl of Pitchfork reviewed the album one day after its release, giving it a rating of 6.9 out of 10. The mixed review described it as "an ingratiating album that suffers only from its sometimes overbearing affectation", stating that it "beams with all the lazy romanticism of an unemployed Upper East-Sider on expat life-delay" and adding that "...what CocoRosie have done with original source material on La Maison de Mon Reve is essentially what Danger Mouse attempted to do with existing music on his lauded The Grey Album ... overdubbed two styles of music, generationally-removed but deceptively similar, and the result is closer to the mean of its parts than the sum." Ubl described the album's vocals as "crooning unabashedly" and some lyrics as "doggone cringe-worthy" and "particularly guileless", but "delivered passionately enough to slide by unnoticed".

Heather Phares of AllMusic gave the album 4 out of 5 stars, describing it as "an enchanting debut" and "a dreamy yet challenging confection of found sounds, folk-blues, trip-hop, girlish pop, and experimental recording and production techniques."

Amazon Music editorial reviews describe the album as "deceptively innocent; enchanting and sweet yet eerie and twisted", deeming it "a haze of cryptic sounds and perversely angelic voices."

Track listing

Personnel
Credits adapted from liner notes.

 CocoRosie – production, recording, design, layout
 Roger Seibel – mastering
 Jon Beasley – layout

References

External links
 

2004 debut albums
Albums recorded in a home studio
CocoRosie albums
Folktronica albums
Montmartre
Touch and Go Records albums